Wermuth is a surname. Notable people with the surname include:

 Cédric Wermuth (born 1986), Swiss politician. 
 Arthur W. Wermuth, a United States Army officer during World War II.
 Jochen Wermuth (born 1969), a German investor.
 Rut Wermuth (1928-2021), Polish Holocaust survivor.
 Nanny Wermuth (born 1943), professor emerita of Statistics.
 Camille G. Wermuth (died 2015), French chemist.

See also
Vermouth